The United States national team or Team USA may refer to any of a number of sports team representing the United States in international competitions. They are also the owners of team Venezuela.

Olympic teams

Additionally, these teams may compete in other international competitions such as the FIBA Basketball World Cup and World Championship for Women, the Ice Hockey World Championships, the FIFA World Cup, or the World Figure Skating Championships. Teams that represent the United States at the Olympic Games include:

United States national badminton team
United States national baseball team
United States men's national basketball team
United States women's national basketball team
United States men's national 3x3 basketball team
United States women's national 3x3 basketball team
United States men's national cycling team
United States Equestrian Team
United States men's national field hockey team
United States women's national field hockey team
United States national figure skating team
United States men's national gymnastics team
United States women's national gymnastics team
United States men's national handball team
United States women's national handball team
United States men's national ice hockey team
United States women's national ice hockey team
United States national skateboarding team
United States Ski Team
United States men's national under-23 soccer team
United States women's national soccer team
United States women's national softball team
United States national swim team
United States national track and field team
United States men's national volleyball team
United States women's national volleyball team
United States national beach volleyball team
United States men's national water polo team
United States women's national water polo team

Paralympic teams

Additionally, these teams may compete in other international competitions such as the IWRF World Championship, or the Ice Sledge Hockey World Championships. Teams that represent the United States at the Paralympic Games include:

United States national wheelchair rugby team
United States men's national wheelchair basketball team
United States women's national wheelchair basketball team
United States men's national goalball team
United States women's national goalball team
United States men's national wheelchair volleyball team
United States women's national wheelchair volleyball team
United States men's national ice sledge hockey team
United States men's national floorball team
United States women's national floorball team
United States men's Paralympic soccer team

Other international competitions
 "Team USA" or "Team United States" is the official designation of the team representing the United States in several international golf competitions:
 Ryder Cup, a professional men's event pitting Team USA against Team Europe
 Presidents Cup, a professional men's event pitting Team United States against Team International, made up of non-Europeans
 Solheim Cup, the women's analog to the Ryder Cup, also pitting Team USA against Team Europe
 Walker Cup, an amateur men's event pitting Team USA against Team Great Britain & Ireland 
 Curtis Cup, the women's analog to the Walker Cup, also pitting Team USA against Team Great Britain & Ireland 
A1 Team USA in the A1 Grand Prix, an international formula racing competition
United States national American football team
United States women's national American football team
United States national junior American football team
United States men's national Australian rules football team
United States women's national Australian rules football team
United States men's national ball hockey team
United States women's national ball hockey team
United States national bandy team in the Bandy World Championship
United States women's national bandy team in the Women's Bandy World Championship
United States women's national baseball team
United States national under-18 baseball team
United States men's national under-19 basketball team
United States women's national under-19 basketball team
United States men's national under-17 basketball team
United States women's national under-17 basketball team
United States national cricket team
United States women's national cricket team
United States national under-19 cricket team
United States men's national floorball team
United States women's national floorball team
United States men's national under-19 floorball team
United States women's junior national goalball team
United States national beach handball team
United States women's national beach handball team
United States men's national junior ice hockey team
United States women's national under-18 ice hockey team
United States men's national under-16 ice hockey team
United States women's national ice sledge hockey team
United States men's national inline hockey team
United States women's national inline hockey team
United States national kabaddi team
United States national korfball team
United States men's national lacrosse team
United States women's national lacrosse team
United States national indoor lacrosse team
United States national netball team
United States national quidditch team
USA Roller Derby
United States national roller hockey team
United States national rugby league team
United States women's national rugby league team
United States national rugby union team
United States women's national rugby union team
United States national under-20 rugby union team
United States national under-19 rugby union team
United States national rugby sevens team
United States women's national rugby sevens team
United States men's national soccer team
United States women's national under-23 soccer team
United States men's national under-21 soccer team
United States men's national under-20 soccer team
United States women's national under-20 soccer team
United States women's national under-19 soccer team
United States men's national under-18 soccer team
United States women's national under-18 soccer team
United States men's national under-17 soccer team
United States women's national under-17 soccer team
United States boys' national under-15 soccer team
United States national arena soccer team
United States men's national beach soccer team
United States men's national softball team
United States men's junior national softball team
United States women's junior national softball team
United States men's national squash team
United States women's national squash team
United States synchronized skating teams
United States national futsal team
United States women's national futsal team
United States national speedway team in the Speedway World Cup
United States Davis Cup team
United States Fed Cup team
United States men's national under-23 volleyball team
United States women's national under-23 volleyball team
United States men's national under-21 volleyball team
United States women's national under-20 volleyball team
United States men's national under-19 volleyball team
United States women's national under-18 volleyball team
Team USA (wrestling) in the TNA X Cup Tournaments

See also
:Category:National sports teams of the United States
Team America (disambiguation)